No Kids may refer to:

 No Kids (band), Canadian indie pop band
 No Kids (film), Argentine film